Navajosuchus is an extinct genus of alligatorine crocodylian. Its fossils have been found in the Paleocene-age Nacimiento Formation of the San Juan Basin, New Mexico (United States). It was named in 1942 by Charles C. Mook, and the original type species was N. novomexicanus. N. novomexicanus was based on AMNH 5186, a partial skull collected in 1913. Later research showed that Navajosuchus novomexicanus was the same as the earlier-named Allognathosuchus mooki. However, A. mooki does not belong to the genus Allognathosuchus, and so the name of the crocodilian becomes Navajosuchus mooki. Under whichever name is used, this animal would have been a generalized predator of the Nacimiento floodplains.  It was the most common Nacimiento Formation crocodilian, found in both the Puercan and Torrejonian faunal assemblages.

The precise placement of Navajosuchus within Alligatoroidea is disputed.  Some studies have shown it as a basal member of Alligatoridae, within the stem-based group Alligatorinae, as shown in the cladogram below.

Alternatively, other studies have recovered Navajosuchus outside of Alligatoridae and Alligatorinae, as a basal member of Alligatoroidea within the clade Globidonta, as shown in the cladogram below.

References

Alligatoridae
Paleocene crocodylomorphs
Paleocene reptiles of North America
Prehistoric pseudosuchian genera
Fossil taxa described in 1942